Sikhs in Sweden are a very small religious minority, there are approximately 1000–1500, most of which are settled in Stockholm and Gothenburg, each of which has two gurdwaras.

Gurdwaras
Gurdwaras in Sweden include:
 Gurdwara Sangat Sahib Forening, Botkyrka, Tullinge, Stockholm
 Gurdwara Sri Guru Singh Sabha, Angered
 Sikh Cultural Association, Hjällbo, Gothenburg
 Sikh Temple Sweden —Gurudwara Bibi Nanki Ji, Stockholm

References

Further reading
 

Sweden
Sweden
Religion in Sweden